The Russell Gilbert Show is a short-lived Australian comedy show hosted by Russell Gilbert in 1998. It was partially a spin-off from Hey Hey It's Saturday, where Gilbert had risen to prominence. The show's writers included Kevin Blond, Paul Calleja and Andrew Maj. Seven episodes were filmed and aired. Gilbert's former castmate from The Comedy Company, Glenn Robbins also starred in the show. The show was successful and beat Ally McBeal (Channel 7) in the ratings.

In 2000, a similar concept was attempted: Russell Gilbert Live, which was followed in 2001 by Russell Gilbert Was Here!. Both new shows were relatively short-lived.

See also
GTV

References

Sources

Nine Network original programming
Australian comedy television series
1998 Australian television series debuts
1998 Australian television series endings